Murad Saeed (born 17 August 1995) is a Pakistani politician who served as Federal Minister for Communications and Federal Minister for Postal Services from December 2018 to April 2022.

Previously, he served as Minister of State for Communications and Minister of State for Postal Services from 18 September 2018 and 26 October 2018, respectively to December 2018. He had been a member of the National Assembly of Pakistan, from August 2018 till January 2023. Previously, he served as Minister of State for States and Frontier Regions from 11 September to 18 September 2018.

Previously, he was a member of the National Assembly from June 2013 to May 2018. His term as minister ended on 10 April 2022 when the no-confidence motion against Imran Khan was successful.

Early life and education
Murad Saeed was born on 17 August 1995 at Kabal, Swat. Saeed holds a Bachelor of Science (Hons) degree in Environmental Sciences from University of Peshawar.

Political career
Saeed was the founder of Insaf Student Federation, the student wing of Pakistan Tehreek-e-Insaf (PTI) in Khyber Pakhtunkhwa and remained its central president for four years.

Saeed was elected to the National Assembly of Pakistan as a candidate of PTI from Constituency NA-29 Swat in 2013 Pakistani general election.

He was re-elected to the National Assembly as a candidate of PTI from Constituency NA-4 (Swat-III) in 2018 Pakistani general election. He received 71,600 votes and defeated Saleem Khan, a candidate of Awami National Party (ANP).

Ministerial positions
On 11 September 2018, he was inducted into the federal cabinet of Prime Minister Imran Khan and was appointed as Minister of State for States and Frontier Regions. On 18 September, his ministerial portfolio was changed and he was appointed as Minister of State for Communications.
On 26 October 2018, he was given the additional ministerial portfolio of Postal Services and was appointed as Minister of State for Postal Services.

On 17 December 2018, he was elevated as Federal Minister  and was appointed as Federal Minister for Communications, and Federal Minister for Postal Services.

Murad Saeed obtained the best ministry award during his Ministerial tenure.

Controversies 
Saeed made national news in March 2017, when a scuffle broke out between him and fellow MNA Mian Javed Latif. Saeed reportedly attempted to assault Javed Latif outside the National Assembly building after Latif made lewd remarks in the assembly about Imran khan and called him a betrayal and rebel. Latif later apologized for his lewd remarks. The issue was resolved later by the National Assembly Jirga. In April 2018, he again made national news after a scuffle broke out between him and Abid Sher Ali inside the National Assembly.

In 2015, another scandal emerged when Saeed's Bachelor of Science  degree was challenged, it was alleged that his detailed marks certificates do not have an official stamp. Furthermore, it was alleged that malpractices were made during his BS semester make-up examination. 
The University of Peshawar maintained that there are problems found in his make-up examination and said that Saeed's marks certificate does not have its official stamp for his degree in B.Sc. Environmental Sciences degree. However, Murad Saeed dismisses allegations and said that the vice chancellor belong to his political opponent party Awami National Party.

Following the controversy, Saeed approached the Peshawar High Court and told that he had attended University of Peshawar from 2005 to 2009 for his undergraduate degree and passed all his courses. In 2015, the University of Peshawar requested the Peshawar High Court to disqualify Saeed from his National Assembly seat for making a false declaration of his Bachelor of Science degree while filing nomination papers for the 2013 general elections. In March 2018, the Peshawar High Court dismissed the petition and closed case against Murad Saeed.

References

Living people
Pakistan Tehreek-e-Insaf MNAs
Pashtun people
People from Swat District
University of Peshawar alumni
Pakistani MNAs 2013–2018
1963 births
Pakistani MNAs 2018–2023
Federal ministers of Pakistan